Lactones are cyclic carboxylic esters, containing a 1-oxacycloalkan-2-one structure, or analogues having unsaturation or heteroatoms replacing one or more carbon atoms of the ring.

Lactones are formed by intramolecular esterification of the corresponding hydroxycarboxylic acids, which takes place spontaneously when the ring that is formed is five- or six-membered. Lactones with three- or four-membered rings (α-lactones and β-lactones) are very reactive, making their isolation difficult. Special methods are normally required for the laboratory synthesis of small-ring lactones as well as those that contain rings larger than six-membered.

Nomenclature

Lactones are usually named according to the precursor acid molecule (aceto = 2 carbon atoms, propio = 3, butyro = 4, valero = 5, capro = 6, etc.), with a -lactone suffix and a Greek letter prefix that specifies the number of carbon atoms in the heterocycle — that is, the distance between the relevant -OH and the -COOH groups along said backbone. The first carbon atom after the carbon in the -COOH group on the parent compound is labelled α, the second will be labeled β, and so forth. Therefore, the prefixes also indicate the size of the lactone ring: α-lactone = 3-membered ring, β-lactone = 4-membered, γ-lactone = 5-membered, etc. Macrocyclic lactones are known as macrolactones.

The other suffix used to denote a lactone is -olide, used in substance class names like butenolide, macrolide, cardenolide or bufadienolide.

To obtain the preferred IUPAC names, lactones are named as heterocyclic pseudoketones by adding the suffix ‘one’, ‘dione’, ‘thione’, etc. and the appropriate multiplicative prefixes to the name of the heterocyclic parent hydride.

Etymology
The name lactone derives from the ring compound called lactide, which is formed from the dehydration of 2-hydroxypropanoic acid (lactic acid) CH3-CH(OH)-COOH. Lactic acid, in turn, derives its name from its original isolation from soured milk (Latin: lac, lactis). The name was coined in 1844 by the French chemist Théophile-Jules Pelouze, who first obtained it as a derivative of lactic acid. An internal dehydration reaction within the same molecule of lactic acid would have produced alpha-propiolactone, a lactone with a 3-membered ring.

In 1880 the German chemist Wilhelm Rudolph Fittig extended the name "lactone" to all intramolecular carboxylic esters.

Natural sources 
Naturally occurring lactones are mainly saturated and unsaturated γ- and δ-lactones, and to a lesser extent macrocyclic lactones. The γ- and δ-lactones are intramolecular esters of the corresponding hydroxy fatty acids. They contribute to the aroma of fruits, butter, cheese, and other foods. Cyclopentadecanolide is responsible for the musklike odor of angelica root oil. Of the naturally occurring bicyclic lactones, phthalides are responsible for the odors of celery and lovage oils, and coumarin for woodruff. Lactones are present in oak wood, and they contribute to the flavour profile of Barrel-aged beers.

Lactone rings occur widely as building blocks in nature, such as in ascorbic acid, kavain, nepetalactone, gluconolactone, hormones (spironolactone, mevalonolactone), enzymes (lactonase), neurotransmitters (butyrolactone, avermectins), antibiotics (macrolides like erythromycin; amphotericin B), anticancer drugs (vernolepin, epothilones), phytoestrogens (resorcylic acid lactones, cardiac glycosides).

Synthesis

Many methods in ester synthesis can also be applied to that of lactones. In one industrial synthesis of oxandrolone the key lactone-forming step is an organic reaction - esterification.

In halolactonization, an alkene is attacked by a halogen via electrophilic addition with the cationic intermediate captured intramolecularly by an adjacent carboxylic acid (See also iodolactamization).

Specific methods include Yamaguchi esterification, Shiina macrolactonization, Corey-Nicolaou macrolactonization, Baeyer–Villiger oxidation and nucleophilic abstraction.

The γ-lactones γ-octalactone, γ-nonalactone, γ-decalactone, γ-undecalactone can be prepared in good yield in a one-step process by radical addition of primary fatty alcohols to acrylic acid, using di-tert-butyl peroxide as a catalyst.

Reactions
The most stable structure for lactones are the 5-membered γ-lactones and 6-membered δ-lactones because, as in all organic cycles, 5 and 6 membered rings minimize the strain of bond angles. γ-lactones are so stable that, in the presence of dilute acids at room temperature, 4-hydroxy acids (R-CH(OH)-(CH2)2-COOH) immediately undergo spontaneous esterification and cyclisation to the lactone. β-lactones do exist, but can only be made by special methods. α-lactones can be detected as transient species in mass spectrometry experiments.

The reactions of lactones are similar to those of esters, as exemplified by gamma-lactone in the following sections:

Hydrolysis
Heating a lactone with a base (sodium hydroxide) will hydrolyse the lactone to its parent compound, the straight chained bifunctional compound. Like straight-chained esters, the hydrolysis-condensation reaction of lactones is a reversible reaction, with an equilibrium. However, the equilibrium constant of the hydrolysis reaction of the lactone is lower than that of the straight-chained ester i.e. the products (hydroxyacids) are less favored in the case of the lactones. This is because although the enthalpies of the hydrolysis of esters and lactones are about the same, the entropy of the hydrolysis of lactones is less than the entropy of straight-chained esters. Straight-chained esters give two products upon hydrolysis, making the entropy change more favorable than in the case of lactones which gives only a single product.

Reduction
Lactones can be reduced to diols using lithium aluminium hydride in dry ether. The reduction reaction will first break the ester bond of the lactone, and then reduce the aldehyde group (-CHO) to the alcohol group (-OH). For instance, gamma-lactones will be reduced to butane-1,4-diol, (CH2(OH)-(CH2)2-CH2(OH).

Aminolysis
Lactones also react with ethanolic ammonia, which will first break the ester bond and then react with the acidic -COOH group, because of the basic properties of ammonia, to form a difunctional group, i.e. alcohol and amide. Gamma-lactones will react to yield CH2(OH)-(CH2)2-CO-NH2.

Polymerization 
Lactones readily form polyesters according to the formula, and have been shown to oligomerize without catalyst as well:

Michael reaction
Sesquiterpene lactones, found in many plants, can react with other molecules via a Michael reaction.

Uses

Flavors and fragrances 
Lactones contribute significantly to the flavor of fruit, and of unfermented and fermented dairy products, and are therefore used as flavors and fragrances. Some examples are γ-decalactone (4-decanolide), which has a characteristic peach flavor; δ-decalactone (5-decanolide), which has a creamy coconut/peach flavour; γ-dodecalactone (4-dodecanolide), which also has a coconut/fruity flavor, a description which also fits γ-octalactone (4-octanolide), although it also has a herbaceous character; γ-nonalactone, which has an intense coconut flavor of this series, despite not occurring in coconut, and γ-undecalactone.

Macrocyclic lactones (cyclopentadecanolide, 15-pentadec-11/12-enolide) have odors similar to macrocyclic ketones of animal origin (muscone, civetone), but they can be prepared more easily, for example, by depolymerization of the corresponding linear polyesters. Replacement of a methylene unit by oxygen barely affects the odor of these compounds, and oxalactones with 15 – 17-membered rings are produced in addition to cyclopentadecanolide (e. g., 12-oxa-16-hexadecanolide).

Prebiotic chemistry 
Prebiotically plausible lactones, such as ε-caprolactone and δ-valerolactone, have been shown to oligomerize without the usage of catalysts forming oligomers that may have been relevant during the origin of life.

Plastics 
Polycaprolactone is an important plastic.

Examples 

Macrolides
Kavalactones

Dilactones 
Ellagic acid (Hexahydroxydiphenic acid dilactone)
Flavogallonic acid dilactone can be found in Rhynchosia volubilis seeds and in Shorea laeviforia
Lactide
Tergallic acid dilactone can be found in Rhynchosia volubilis seeds
Valoneic acid dilactone can be isolated from the heartwood of Shorea laeviforia
Ethylene brassylate (Musk T), a widely used synthetic musk

See also 
 Lactam, a cyclic amide
 Lactim, a cyclic imide
 Lactide, a cyclic diester
 Halolactonization
 Phthalein

References and notes

 
Functional groups